Skiing is a means of transport using skis to glide on snow.

Skiing may also refer to:

Sand skiing, a sport and form of skiing in which the skier rides down a sand dune on skis, using ski poles
Water skiing, a surface water sport in which an individual is pulled behind a boat or a cable ski installation over a body of water, skimming the surface on two skis or one ski
Skiing (magazine), a magazine published between 1948 and 2010
Skiing (Atari 2600), a 1980 video game
Skiing (Intellivision video game), a 1980 video game
Skiing (gaming), a move in video gaming